= Lilyana Boyanova =

Bulgarian journalist and television presenter

Lilyana Boyanova (born 12 May 1983 in Pleven) is a Bulgarian journalist and television presenter, known for her segment We Believe in the Good on bTV News. In 2016, she was the recipient of the "Saviour of Childhood" award from the National Association for Foster Care.
